Lima Sopoaga (born 3 February 1991) is a professional rugby union player who plays for Lyon in the Top 14 competition. His regular playing positions are Fly-Half and Centre.

Early life

Sopoaga was born in Wellington, New Zealand. His family comes from Samoa and the Cook Islands.

Sopoaga is the oldest among six siblings. His younger brother, Tupou Sopoaga, played for the Penrith Panthers in the NRL but switched codes and played alongside Lima at the Highlanders for a time.

In his high school days, Lima Sopoaga attended Wellington College and won four local championships with the 1st XV. He captained the school's side in 2009 and was selected for the NZ Secondary Schools team.

Club career

Provincial Rugby

Wellington Lions
At the age of 19, Sopoaga played for Wellington in the 2010 ITM Cup, making his debut against Manawatu. His strong performances established himself as the squad's starting number 10. He finished the season with 88 points in 9 appearances to help Wellington to reach the final of the competition, where he scored 21 points despite losing to Canterbury.

Southland Stags
In late May 2014, Sopoaga announced that he will be joining the Southland Stags for the 2014 and 2015 seasons. The transfer from the Wellington Lions to the Stags keeps Sopoaga in Highlanders territory. Playing for Southland, Lima joins another current Highlander in Elliot Dixon.

Sopoaga, excited by the move as reported by Rugby Southland; "The opportunity came up and it is a good fit to stay in the Highlander franchise and represent the region in the Super 15 and ITM Cup. I’m really starting to feel at home in the south now and proud to be part of the region. The Stags boys in the Highlanders have nothing but good things to say about the Stags and the Southland province and I’m looking forward to getting to Southland and giving my all for my new team."

Super Rugby
Sopoaga followed his former Wellington coach Jamie Joseph south, signing on with the Highlanders for the 2011 Super Rugby season. Expected to back up Colin Slade, he ended up starting the opening game of the season against the Hurricanes due to Slade being injured. He responded in fine fashion by scoring a try and kicking two penalties in a 14–9 victory. However, in his second start of the season he suffered a shoulder injury which ruled him out of the team until the late stages of the season. In 2015 he helped guide the Highlanders to their first super rugby title by defeating the 1st place Hurricanes 21–14. Sopoaga scored the most points of any Super Rugby player in 2015, scoring 191 points that season.

The Highlanders failed to make the finals in 2016, losing 42–30 against the Lions in the semi-final. Sopoaga was one of the few Highlanders to shine in the 2016 semi-final, scoring a try and kicking accurately, ending his 2016 Super Rugby season with 186 points.

Sopoaga was pulled from the field in a 16–12 win over the Blues on 11 March 2017 after suffering a hamstring injury when he performed a try-saving tackle on All Blacks team-mate and Blues midfielder George Moala. Sopoaga made his return from injury to replace Marty Banks off the bench in a 55–6 win over the Western Force on 20 May 2017. The departing Banks scored more points in the 2017 Super Rugby season than Sopoaga due to Sopoaga spending two months out injured. Sopoaga scored 54 points in the 2017 season, failing to score any in the quarter-final against the Crusaders where the Highlanders lost 17–0.

Sopoaga started for the Highlanders against the touring British and Irish Lions side on 13 June 2017, contributing eight points to the Highlanders' narrow 23–22 win over the Lions before being replaced by Banks in the 54th minute.

Wasps
On 15 January 2018, Sopoaga confirmed to be leaving the Highlanders and New Zealand to join top English side Wasps in the Gallagher Premiership from the 2018–19 season. Sopoaga made his Wasps debut on 8 September 2018 in a 31–42 defeat to Exeter Chiefs, he came on as a substitute in the second half and scored a conversion from a try scored by Dan Robson. He made his full starting debut the following game week, on 16 September, scoring 18 points (three conversions and four penalties) in a high scoring, 41–35 win over the Leicester Tigers.

Lyon
On 13 April 2021, Sopoaga would leave Wasps as he will travel to France to join Top 14 outfit Lyon from the 2021-22 season.

International career
After an injury to Chiefs captain Aaron Cruden, Sopoaga's Super Rugby efforts in 2015 saw him gaining selection for New Zealand. Sopoaga was named in the All Blacks' 41-man squad for the 2015 Rugby Championship, making his international debut against South Africa in Johannesburg on 25 July 2015, debuting alongside lock James Broadhurst. Sopoaga started the match and was not subbed off, with replacement Beauden Barrett replacing Israel Dagg off the bench instead of Sopoaga who scored 12 points on debut, guiding the All Blacks to a 27–20 win. Sopoaga narrowly missed out on selection for the 2015 Rugby World Cup, with selectors preferring 100-plus test veteran Dan Carter and the versatility of Colin Slade and Barrett.

Sopoaga was re-selected for the All Blacks in the Steinlager series against Wales in 2016. After Cruden was injured again, Sopoaga made his second test appearance in the third test against Wales on 25 June 2016 which was a 46–6 win at Sopoaga'a home crowd in Dunedin. Sopoaga replaced Ryan Crotty off the bench in the 55th minute, covering inside centre for the rest of the test. Sopoaga made four more appearances in the black jersey in 2016, scoring 10 points that year.

Following the departure of Aaron Cruden to France and the inexperienced Damian McKenzie being used at fullback, Sopoaga carried a far heavier workload for the All Blacks in the 2017 season. Sopoaga replaced Beauden Barrett in the 59th minute of a 78–0 win over Samoa, converting two tries. Sopoaga also went across for what would have been his first try that match, but it was disallowed after he received a forward pass from replacement scrum-half TJ Perenara. Following the win over Samoa, Sopoaga made another 11 appearances for the All Blacks that year. Sopoaga scored his first test try on 16 September 2017 in a 57-0 demolishing of South Africa after replacing man-of-the match Nehe Milner-Skudder in the 53rd minute.

Concussion to Barrett saw Sopoaga step up in the second test against South Africa in 2017, replacing Barrett only 33 minutes into the game. Sopoaga scored 7 points that day, converting tries by McKenzie and winger Rieko Ioane. Sopoaga also attempted a drop goal in the 76th minute but missed. Springbok replacement back Damian de Allende attempted to charge down the kick but was controversially red-carded for a late hit on Sopoaga. The Springboks were further punished by De Allende's mistake because of Sopoaga turning the penalty given into 3 points, the deciding factor in the All Blacks' 25–24 win that day.

Barrett's continued concussion symptoms saw Sopoaga named to start for only the second time in his international career, starting against the Wallabies for 2017's third Bledisloe Cup test on 22 October 2017. An attempted pass from Sopoaga to midfielder Sonny Bill Williams went wrong in the 6th minute of the test, with Wallabies winger Reece Hodge intercepting to score a try. Sopoaga recovered well to score 8 points but was subbed off in the 60th minute for David Havili, with McKenzie moving into first-five. The Wallabies went on to win 23–18.

Sopoaga made an appearance in every All Blacks fixture on the 2017 end-of-season tour, replacing Havili and McKenzie against the Barbarians and France. Sopoaga earned a mid-week start against a French XV on 14 November 2017 where Sopoaga did not miss a kick at goal. He was replaced by debutant Richie Mo'unga in the 53rd minute. Sopoaga followed up the performance against the French XV by replacing Waisake Naholo off the bench against Scotland and Wales. Sopoaga's signing announced with the Wasps will likely mean his appearance off the bench against Wales on 25 November 2017 will be his last test for New Zealand.

Personal life
Sopoaga missed the second test against Argentina in 2017 due to the birth of his first child, a daughter named Milla.

References

External links

1991 births
New Zealand rugby union players
New Zealand sportspeople of Cook Island descent
New Zealand sportspeople of Samoan descent
Highlanders (rugby union) players
Wellington rugby union players
Rugby union fly-halves
Living people
Rugby union players from Wellington City
Southland rugby union players
Barbarian F.C. players
New Zealand international rugby union players
New Zealand expatriate sportspeople in France
Expatriate rugby union players in France
New Zealand expatriate rugby union players
Lyon OU players
Wasps RFC players
New Zealand expatriate sportspeople in England
Expatriate rugby union players in England